Love Will Lead the Way is the sixth studio album by Tongan-American family band The Jets, released in 1997 by Shadow Mountain Records.

Critical reception
AllMusic wrote that "while there's nothing earthshaking in terms of musical boundaries pushed, the album is recommended for its ease on the ears and soul."

Track listing
 "Forever with You" – 4:08
 "Tell Me I'm Not Wrong Again" – 4:34
 "Jacque's Friend" – 4:11
 "Love People" – 4:01
 "Whispers of My Heart" – 4:04
 "Love is the Answer" – 4:12
 "Love Will Lead the Way" – 4:08
 "Would I Know You" – 3:24
 "Face to Face" – 4:24
 "Prayer of the Heart" – 3:14
 "I Stand All Amazed" – 3:24

References

1997 albums
The Jets (band) albums